Artemis is a tiny lunar impact crater located in the Mare Imbrium. Craters of this dimension typically form cup-shaped excavations on the surface of the Moon. It lies near the midpoint between the craters Euler to the west and Lambert to the east. Just a few kilometers to the southeast is the even smaller Verne.

It is named after Artemis, a Greek goddess who symbolizes the Moon and a Greek female first name.

References

External links
Artemis, 40A4S1(10), Lunar Topophotomap

 
 
 
 
 
 
 
 
 
 
 

Impact craters on the Moon
Mare Imbrium